The 2021 UCI Track Champions League was the first edition of the UCI Track Champions League, a track cycling competition held over four rounds in November and December 2021.

It was established in March 2020 by the Union Cycliste Internationale (UCI) and Discovery, Inc. as the UCI Track Cycling World League, before the UCI Track Champions League name was adopted the following November.

Titles were awarded in two categories – Endurance and Sprint – for women and men; the women's titles were won by Emma Hinze (Sprint) and Katie Archibald (Endurance), while the men's titles were won by Harrie Lavreysen (Sprint) and Gavin Hoover (Endurance).

Events
The inaugural season of the UCI Track Champions League was due to consist of six events in November and December 2021. In September, the scheduled second round – due to be held at the Vélodrome National in Saint-Quentin-en-Yvelines on 20 November – was cancelled without replacement, due to its continued use as a vaccination centre during the COVID-19 pandemic in France. The scheduled final round – due to be held at the Sylvan Adams National Velodrome in Tel Aviv on 11 December – was cancelled on 2 December, following a change in public health restrictions associated with the COVID-19 pandemic in Israel, which resulted in the country's borders being closed to non-citizens.

Each round had two races for each of the two categories of racing, for a total of eight races during the season. The Sprint category consisted of individual sprint and keirin races, while the Endurance category consisted of scratch and elimination races.

Points standings

Scoring system
Points were awarded to the top fifteen riders, with twenty points being awarded to each race winner. In the case of a tie on points, a countback system was used where the highest most recent race result determined the final positions. The leader of each classification was denoted by a light blue jersey.

Sprint

Women

Men

Endurance

Women

Men

Notes

References

External links

Champions League
UCI
UCI
UCI
UCI
UCI
UCI
International cycle races hosted by Lithuania
International cycle races hosted by Spain
International cycle races hosted by the United Kingdom
UCI Track Champions League